Kapooria is a fungal genus in the family Valsaceae. This is a monotypic genus, containing the single species Kapooria musarum, first described as Cryptosporella musarum by J. Kapoor in 1968.

References

External links

Diaporthales
Monotypic Sordariomycetes genera